Mildred Okwo is a Nigerian film director and producer. She was nominated for Best Director award at the 4th Africa Movie Academy Awards. In 2012 she directed the romance comedy-drama film The Meeting which won several awards including Nigeria Entertainment Awards, Africa Movie Academy Awards and Nollywood Movies Awards.

Personal
Okwo was born on 29 April 1966 in Lagos, Lagos State, Nigeria. She studied Theater Arts at University of Benin. She is also studied law at the Whittier Law School, Orange County, California, USA.

Okwo is a Nigerian film director and producer whose films have been nominated and won several prestigious awards in Africa including AMVCA, AMAA, NMA and "Publix du Prix" at Nollywood Paris.  In 2006, after her return to Nigeria, she wrote, co-produced and directed her film ‘30 days'''. Many popular film actors in Nigeria performed in the film including Joke Silver, Najite Dede, GenevieveNnaji, Segun Arinze, Rita Dominic, Kate Henshaw and Norbert Young. 30 days was released in the US on April 30, 2006. It received 10 nominations at the 2008 Africa Movie Academy Awards including Best Art Direction, Best Screen Play, Best Cinematography and Best Picture. In 2016, Okwo was named one of "50 Women Shaping Africa" by Elle Magazine and 100 Most influential people in Nigeria by Y'Naija.com

Academy Awards Committee
Okwo alongside eleven other Nollywood practitioners founded the Nigerian Oscars Selection Committee (NOSC) and were approved by the Academy of Motion Picture Arts and Sciences (AMPAS) to screen Nigerian films to be submitted for the Best Foreign Language Film category at the Academy Awards.

Filmography30 Days (2006)The Meeting (2012)Suru L'ere (2016)La Femme Anjola'' (2019)

Awards and nominations

See also
 List of Nigerian actors
 List of Nigerian film producers
 List of Nigerian film directors

References

External links

Living people
University of Benin (Nigeria) alumni
Nigerian film directors
Nigerian women film directors
Year of birth missing (living people)
Nigerian film producers
Nigerian women film producers